Jordi Farragut Mesquida, anglicized as George Farragut (born September 29 or September 30, 1755 – June 4, 1817), was a Spanish  American naval officer, born in Ciutadella de Menorca, then under British occupation.  He fought during the American Revolutionary War and with the Continental Army in battles in the South. After commanding a Spanish trading ship in the Gulf of Mexico and Caribbean, he had joined the South Carolina Navy as a lieutenant when the war broke out. He anglicized his Catalan name when he joined the South Carolina Navy.

Early life
Jordi Farragut Mesquida was born to Antoni Farragut and Joana Mesquida in Ciutadella, Menorca (an overseas territory of the Kingdom of Great Britain between 1708 and 1782, now part of Spain). He first went to sea at the age of 10, and left Menorca as a young man to join the Spanish merchant marine after studies in the Barcelona School of  nautical studies.  He commanded a small vessel that traded goods between Veracruz (Mexico), New Orleans (under Spanish rule), and ports in the Caribbean, namely Havana, Cuba.

American War of Independence
He joined his new country at the beginning of the American Revolution, initially as a lieutenant in the South Carolina Navy, and anglicized his first name to George. Farragut fought the British at Savannah and was captured in the Siege of Charleston in 1780. Farragut's left arm was broken by a cannonball during the fighting in Charlestown. After being released in a prisoner exchange, he fought as a volunteer at the Battle of Cowpens and at Wilmington. He was described by his contemporary George W. Siever "as a short, chunky man; very brave and a funny genius." 

North Carolina service record:
 NC State Regiment: 1782–1783, On May 1, 1782, he was selected as a major over the units of Light Horse within the North Carolina State Regiment. His unit was disbanded in January 1783.

Marriage and family 
After the war, Farragut married Scotch-Irish American Elizabeth Shine (1765–1808) from North Carolina.  They moved west to Tennessee, where their son David Farragut (born James Glasgow Farragut) was born in 1801.  They had several children.

After President Thomas Jefferson bought the Louisiana territory, people were needed to staff the new U.S. port at New Orleans. Many residents of the former French and Spanish city distrusted anglos; Jefferson's policy favored staffing New Orleans with officials who spoke French or Spanish.  East Tennessee native William C.C. Claiborne, a good friend of Farragut's, became the territory's first U.S. governor.  His recommendation of Farragut resulted in the offer of a new job.  His son James, who would grow up to become Admiral David Farragut, was born in 1801. In 1805, Farragut moved to New Orleans, and his family followed, in a 1,700-mile flatboat adventure aided by hired rivermen, the young James Farragut's first voyage.

The family was still living in New Orleans in 1808.  There Farragut met David Porter Sr., another navy officer who had served in the Revolution and was living with his son, also named David Porter, on active duty with the Navy as an officer.  The senior Porter was brought to their house one day suffering from sunstroke, and, despite Elizabeth's care, he died.  The same day, Elizabeth died of yellow fever.  George, age 53, made plans to place his young children with friends and family who could better care for them.

He was visited by the younger Porter, who thanked him for his wife's care of his father and expressed sympathy for his loss.  Porter offered to adopt James and introduce him to a career in the Navy. James and his father agreed.  Soon after, George Farragut bought a large piece of property outside of town on the Pascagoula River, and spent his final years there.

Death
Jordi Farragut Mesquida died in Pascagoula, Mississippi, on June 4, 1817, at age 62 of yellow fever.

See also

Hispanics in the United States Navy

References

Legacy: Spain and the United States in the Age of Independence, 1763–1848, National Portrait Gallery, Sociedad Estatal para la Acción Cultural Exterior de España (SEACEX), the Smithsonian Latino Center, and the Fundación Consejo España-Estados Unidos.

External links
 Contribution of Spanish and Latin Americans to the American Revolutionary War

1755 births
1817 deaths
George
United States Navy personnel of the American Revolution
North Carolina militiamen in the American Revolution
People from Menorca
Spanish military personnel of the American Revolutionary War
Spanish emigrants to the United States